Corneille of Berghes or de Glymes-Berghes (1490?–1560?) was Prince-bishop of Liège between 1538 and 1544.

Corneille of Berghes was the youngest son of Cornelis of Glymes, Admiral of the Netherlands and Maria Margaretha van  Zevenbergen. First he was Prévôt in the Saint Peter's Collegiate church in Lille, then he stayed in Mechelen at the court of Margaret of Austria. In 1520 he became Coadjutor bishop in Liège, and when Prince-Bishop Érard de La Marck died in 1538, was made his successor by Holy Roman Emperor Charles V.

His reign was a disaster, because of his fanatic persecution of presumed heretics, which alienated himself from the population. He resigned in 1544 to get married. Very little was registered about the rest of his life and marriage, only that he died around 1560.

Sources
 Joseph Daris, Histoire du diocèse et de la principauté de Liège pendant le XVIe siècle, Liège, Louis Demarteau, 1884, 698 p. « La principauté et le diocèse sous Corneille de Berghes », p. 123-142

1560 deaths
16th-century Roman Catholic bishops in the Holy Roman Empire
Prince-Bishops of Liège
Glymes family
Year of birth uncertain